Ohlman is a village in Montgomery County, Illinois, United States. As of the 2020 census, the village had a population of 109.

History
The village is named for Michael Ohlman, a Civil War captain of a Mississippi River steamboat. The settlement was located on the Chicago and Eastern Illinois Railroad.

Geography 

Demographics 

The census of 2000 showed there were no people living in the village; a recount in 2004 issued a revised population of 148.

See also

 List of municipalities in Illinois

References

External links

 Ohlman Illinois, Historical Society of Montgomery County Illinois

Villages in Montgomery County, Illinois
Villages in Illinois